Devin D. Ratray (born January 11, 1977) is an American actor. He is known for his role as Buzz McCallister in the Home Alone franchise, as well as the films Nebraska, Blue Ruin and Kimi. His television work includes The Tick and Better Call Saul.

Career
Ratray started acting at the age of nine in the movie Where Are the Children? (1986). He starred as a child actor in various other programs and movies until his acting pinnacle in 1990 as Buzz McCallister, the mean older brother of Macaulay Culkin's character Kevin in Home Alone and Home Alone 2: Lost in New York, a role he later reprised in Home Sweet Home Alone (2021).

Ratray landed minor roles in Little Monsters (as Ronnie Coleman, the bully), Dennis the Menace (as Mickey, the boyfriend of one of Dennis's babysitters) and an episode as Martin in The Enforcers (1996). Another film role was The Prince and Me as the computer-obsessed roommate of Eddy, the royal Prince of Denmark. He was a regular improv actor on MTV's Damage Control, notably as a director of an erotic film called Crazy Motor Hos, in which he was dressed as a naval captain. Ratray appeared in the September 29, 2006 episode of Law & Order, "Avatar", as the mentally ill murderer Richard Elam.  He later portrayed an antagonist in an episode of Law & Order: Special Victims Unit. He was a lisping doctor in the movie Slippery Slope (2006). He performed as Jimmy Link in Serial (2007). Ratray appeared in the 2009 film Surrogates as Bobby Saunders. Variety said "Ratray gets good mileage out of his role as a computer whiz too proud of his corpulent geekiness to consider a more glamorous substitute." In 2009, he was also a guest star on the fifth season of Supernatural in the episode "The Real Ghost Busters".

In late 2007, a documentary film crew followed Ratray's attempts to win the heart of US Secretary of State Condoleezza Rice. He used 'love disks' -- love letters set to music and images—to serenade her, and traveled from New York, to Alabama, Denver, Palo Alto and Washington, DC to court her. The resulting film, Courting Condi, was due for international release in fall 2008.

In 2012, Ratray played a mutual funds manager trapped in a Wall Street elevator with eight strangers, in the suspense thriller Elevator.

In 2013, Ratray played Cole in the film Nebraska, Ben Gaffney in the film Blue Ruin, and made an appearance in the film R.I.P.D.

Ratray also appeared in the 2019 film Hustlers, alongside Jennifer Lopez and in 2022, he appeared in the Steven Soderbergh film Kimi, alongside Zoe Kravitz.

Personal life
Ratray was born in New York City, the son of Ann Willis and Peter Ratray, both actors. He graduated from New York's Fiorello H. LaGuardia High School in 1994.

On December 8, 2021, Ratray allegedly strangled his girlfriend while in a hotel room in Oklahoma. He was "booked for domestic assault and battery by strangulation, a felony, as well as misdemeanor domestic assault and battery." After an argument over his girlfriend failing to charge fans for his autograph, the duo returned to the hotel and "Ratray then pushed his girlfriend onto the room’s bed, pressed one of his hands against her throat, pressed his other hand over her mouth and applied pressure, according to the affidavit." It was alleged that as Ratray assaulted his girlfriend, he told her, "This is how you die".

In August 2022, police announced that Ratray was under investigation for an alleged rape that occurred in September 2017. The alleged victim, who had been friends with Ratray for 15 years, came forward after hearing about the 2021 domestic assault allegations, accusing Ratray of drugging her drink.

Filmography

Film

Television

Video games

Producer

References

External links
Article in the Evanston Review
Article in TalkMoviesWorld.com

1977 births
Living people
20th-century American male actors
21st-century American male actors
American male child actors
American male film actors
American male television actors
Male actors from New York City